William or Willie Telfer may refer to:
William Telfer (academic) (1886–1968), English clergyman and academic
William Telfer (politician) (1885–1955), Australian politician
Willie Telfer (footballer, born 1909), Scottish footballer
Willie Telfer (footballer, born 1925), Scottish footballer
Willie Telfer (Scottish footballer), Scottish footballer